Henry II of Münsterberg ( – 11 March 1420) was Duke of Münsterberg (Ziębice) since 1410 until his death (as co-ruler of his brother John I).

He was the third son of Duke Bolko III of Münsterberg by his wife Euphemia, daughter of Duke Bolesław of Bytom.

Life
There is little known about his life. After his death, his brother John I ruled alone.

References
 
 
 Gnealogical database by Herbert Stoyan
 Genealogy of the Dukes of Ziębice

1390s births
1420 deaths
Dukes of Münsterberg
Piast dynasty